WFID (95.7 FM), branded on-air as Fidelity, is a radio station licensed to serve Río Piedras, Puerto Rico, established in 1958.  it is owned by the Uno Radio Group, and the broadcast license held by Madifide, Inc.

WFID broadcasts an bilingual Top 40/CHR format.

History

WFID's predecessor was Fidelity Broadcasting Corporation. The founders, Rafael Acosta and his wife Victoria Suarez, made their first broadcast from their house with a 250W FM transmitter on November 17, 1958 before hiring others. It was Puerto Rico's third FM radio station (along with WIOB in Mayagüez and WKAQ-FM in San Juan).

Originally,  WFID broadcast on 95.9 MHz,  but this frequency was at that time catalogued as Class A, subject to power restrictions, so Acosta applied for a change to 95.7 MHz, class B, increased in 1962 to 12,500 watts. Acosta frequently travelled to the United States to stay up to date with technology, particularly the Gates transmitters and equipment.  Acosta died in 1971, before FM became predominant. In 1962 it became the first FM radio station to broadcast in stereo in Puerto Rico and Latin America. After Acosta's death the station was managed by Suarez, known as Doña Vicky, and the Acostas' son José Julián and daughter Carola. In 1980 Beautiful Music Service began broadcasting music for businesses. In 1983 the recently acquired WUNO was turned into NotiUno, a newstalk radio station.  the 50,000-watt WFID was owned and operated by Arso Radio Corporation under Jesús Soto, who had been a friend of Acosta's.

Carlos Montalbán, brother of Ricardo Montalbán was the principal announcer in the early 1970s.  WFID was the first FM radio station to broadcast salsa in stereo, Saturday nights on their program "El Bailable Don Q". The program switched to Spanish ballads when the first salsa FM station came on the air. That radio station was Jesus Soto's WPRM-FM, SalSoul 98.

Satellites

Programming

Amós en Fidelity
El Playlist
Fidelity Retro Lunch
El Happy Hour
De Vuelta a Casa
Fidelity Nocturno
Fidelity Dance Fever
Fidelity Gospel

In the seventies,  WFID programs included:

Temas Musicales del Cine
Nuestra Estrella Invitada
Melodías Identificadas
Juntos Con Don Q (Saturday night, 1979)
Duos Musicales
Oldies Sábado en la noche (1980's)
The Music Man (Friday night) 
Domingo de recuerdos.
Jazzeando, smooth jazz Sunday night, and other programs sponsored by different businesses.

In the sixties programming included segments like:

The General Electric Stereophonic hour (this is the time when they played the few stereophonic records they could find). 
La Hora Hípica (with Pito Rivera Monge,  network with WUNO, WLEO and WLEY among others).
El Bailable Don Q (Saturday night)

References

External links

Mainstream adult contemporary radio stations in the United States
Radio stations established in 1958
1958 establishments in Puerto Rico